Beaverley Aerodrome  is located  north of Beaverley, British Columbia, Canada and  west of the City of Prince George. The aerodrome is home to the Black Ram Parachute School.

References

External links
 Page about this airport on COPA's Places to Fly airport directory

Registered aerodromes in British Columbia